Count Pavel Khristoforovich Grabbe (December 2, 1789 - July 15, 1875) was a Russian cavalry general who led Russian armies in the Caucasus.

References 

Memoirists from the Russian Empire
Recipients of the Gold Sword for Bravery
Recipients of the Order of St. George of the Third Degree
Recipients of the Order of St. George of the Fourth Degree
People of the Napoleonic Wars
People of the Crimean War
Russian people of the November Uprising
Russian military personnel of the Caucasian War
People of the Caucasian War
Members of the State Council (Russian Empire)
Commanders Grand Cross of the Order of the Sword
Recipients of the Order of St. Anna, 3rd class
Recipients of the Order of the White Eagle (Russia)
Recipients of the Order of St. Vladimir, 3rd class
Recipients of the Order of St. Vladimir, 2nd class
Recipients of the Order of St. Vladimir, 1st class
1789 births
1875 deaths